River Forest is a suburban village adjacent to Chicago in Cook County, Illinois, United States. Per the 2020 census, the population was 11,717. Two universities make their home in River Forest, Dominican University and Concordia University Chicago. The village is closely tied to the larger neighboring community of Oak Park. There are significant architectural designs located in River Forest such as the Winslow House by Frank Lloyd Wright. River Forest has a railroad station with service to Chicago on Metra's Union Pacific/West Line.

History

The Native American history of the area is closely tied to the Des Plaines River and includes Menominee and Chippewa settlements near what is now the Desplaines Avenue and Roosevelt Road forest preserves of Cook County. The Menominees would eventually be driven out by the Potowatomi Nation in 1810. The establishment of a steam sawmill on the east bank of the Des Plaines River in 1831, and the proximity to Chicago, were some of the reasons that attracted non-indigenous settlers to the area. In 1842, the first planked road in River Forest, now Lake Street (Chicago), was created, and would eventually connect to the Lake Street extending into downtown Chicago. In 1848 the Galena and Chicago Union Railroad completed construction of tracks westward from Chicago, and train service commenced in January, 1849. The G&CU was later absorbed by the Chicago & Northwestern Railway in 1859 and the C&NW was consolidated into the Union Pacific Railroad in 1995. This line, now called the Union Pacific/West Line between Chicago and Elburn, Illinois is a busy commuter service, jointly operated by Union Pacific and Metra.

Geography

River Forest lies along the Des Plaines River to the west and is bordered by Illinois Route 43 to the east and Illinois Route 64 to the north. Along with the Des Plaines River, much of the western boundary of River Forest consists of the Thatcher Woods forest preserve of Cook County and the Des Plaines River Trail.

Climate

Education

Dominican University and Concordia University Chicago are both located in River Forest.

There are two public elementary schools, Lincoln Elementary School and Willard Elementary School, and one public middle school, Roosevelt Middle School. The elementary and middle schools are in River Forest Public Schools District 90. River Forest shares a high school with Oak Park, known as Oak Park and River Forest High School, located in Oak Park.

River Forest is home to two Catholic grade schools and one Lutheran grade school. St. Luke Parish and St. Vincent Ferrer School are Catholic schools, and Grace Lutheran School is Lutheran. All three enroll children from 3 years old through eighth grade. River Forest has one all-girls' secondary school, Trinity High School.

River Forest also has the Keystone Montessori School, established in 1994. It serves children 9 months of age to 8th grade as an alternative learning style for children. It educates children using the philosophy of Maria Montessori.

The River Forest Public Library is located at 735 Lathrop Avenue.

Government and infrastructure

The United States Postal Service operates the River Forest Post Office at 401 William Street.

Demographics
As of the 2020 census there were 11,717 people, 4,040 households, and 2,754 families residing in the village. The racial makeup of the village was 72.91% White, 7.51% African American, 0.12% Native American, 8.01% Asian, 2.70% from other races, and 8.75% from two or more races. Hispanic or Latino of any race were 8.46% of the population.

There were 4,040 households, out of which 67.30% had children under the age of 18 living with them, 60.69% were married couples living together, 4.80% had a female householder with no husband present, and 31.83% were non-families. 31.83% of all households were made up of individuals, and 15.32% had someone living alone who was 65 years of age or older. The average household size was 3.13 and the average family size was 2.47.

The village's age distribution consisted of 25.4% under the age of 18, 10.5% from 18 to 24, 18.4% from 25 to 44, 28.3% from 45 to 64, and 17.3% who were 65 years of age or older. The median age was 40.8 years. For every 100 females, there were 95.4 males. For every 100 females age 18 and over, there were 92.5 males.

The median income for a household in the village was $125,288, and the median income for a family was $193,171. Males had a median income of $116,643 versus $57,703 for females. The per capita income for the village was $79,929. About 1.3% of families and 2.2% of the population were below the poverty line, including 3.2% of those under age 18 and 1.9% of those age 65 or over.

Note: the US Census treats Hispanic/Latino as an ethnic category. This table excludes Latinos from the racial categories and assigns them to a separate category. Hispanics/Latinos can be of any race.

Architecture 

River Forest is perhaps best known for the diversity of early 20th century American residential architectural styles including several Frank Lloyd Wright designs and others within the Prairie School. The Winslow House and the River Forest Tennis Club are most notable for Frank Lloyd Wright's early styles.

Notable people 

Tony Accardo, crime boss
Anita Alvarez, attorney
Joseph Andriacchi, mobster
Charles F. Baumrucker, jeweler, businessman, politician
Chris Columbus, filmmaker
James Dewar, inventor
Paul Harvey, radio commentator
Gail Mancuso, television and film director
Franklin Clarence Mars, inventor
Kathryn McGee, activist
Kevin Murphy, actor
Edwin Perkins, inventor
Jerry Saltz art critic
Anne Smedinghoff, diplomat
Carlos Zambrano, pitcher for the Chicago Cubs

Notable events 

River Forest hosted the 2016 Little League Baseball Illinois State Tournament at Keystone Park.

2019 Little League Illinois Baseball Champions

For 18 years, the neighborhood has hosted a yearly 9/11 Lemon-Aid stand on the 700 block of Bonnie Brae which donates all proceeds to local charities. The first year, the event raised $400 for Hepzibah Children's Association. Last year, $36,000 was raised for Kidz Express. To date, $323,000 has been donated by the event.

Every year, the Rotary Club of Oak Park River Forest hosts the Food Truck Rally in Keystone Park that donates all net proceeds to local charities. The event includes 10 trucks with sweet, savory, and beer trucks; a live music stage; and a family activities area.

See also 
 River Forest Thomism

References

External links
Village of River Forest official website
River Forest Public Library
River Forest Community Center
Wednesday Journal, newspaper of Oak Park and River Forest
Oak Park – River Forest Chamber of Commerce

 
Villages in Illinois
Villages in Cook County, Illinois
Chicago metropolitan area